The 2001 WNBA All-Star Game was played on July 16, 2001, at TD Waterhouse Centre in Orlando, Florida. This was the 3rd annual WNBA All-Star Game.

The All-Star Game

Rosters

1 Injured
2 Injury replacement
3 Starting in place of injured player

Coaches
The coach for the Western Conference was Houston Comets coach Van Chancellor. The coach for the Eastern Conference was New York Liberty coach Richie Adubato.

References

Wnba All-star Game, 2001
Women's National Basketball Association All-Star Game